Billy Bird (1 January 1899 – 6 February 1951) was a British professional boxer who was active from 1920 to 1948 and boxed in the welterweight division. He fought a recorded 356 times in his 28 year-career and was regarded as one of the most active boxers of his time. He holds the record of the most knockouts in any fighting career.

Career
Bird has 356 recorded fights, but has been rumored to have even more fights during his career which were not professional matches. Bird currently holds the knockout world record at 138; the second closest is Archie Moore with 132 knockouts. Ian Palmer of Goliath listed Bird's achievement as "10 Boxing Records That Will (Probably) Never Be Broken". Robert Aaron Contreras of Bleacher Report believes this record will "never be repeated" as the current active boxer has a knockout record of 51.

On 30 September 1929 Bird won a fight against Leo Wax by decision after a 15-round bout.

Bird worked as a taxi driver when he was not boxing.

Bird died on 6 February 1951.

Professional boxing record

References

External links

1899 births
1951 deaths
Boxers from Greater London
Welterweight boxers
British male boxers
British taxi drivers